Central Registry of Securitisation Asset Reconstruction and Security Interest (CERSAI) is a central online security interest registry of India. It was primarily created to check frauds in lending against equitable mortgages, in which people would take multiple loans on the same asset from different banks.

A Government company licensed under section 8 of the Companies Act, 2013 having its Registered Office at New Delhi.

The company incorporated with majority shareholding of the Central Government, Public Sector Banks and National Housing Bank for the purpose of operating a Registration System under the provisions of Chapter IV of the Securitisation and Reconstruction of Financial Assets and Enforcement of Security Interest Act, 2002. (SARFAESI Act).

Overview
In India, before the formation of CERSAI, information on the encumbrance on a property was known only to the borrower and the lender due to fragmented registration system. As a result, people could obtain multiple loans on the same property. Some people used to take one loan from one bank, which would hold the deed papers. Then they used to take several more loans from other banks using attested copies of the deed, by claiming that they had lost the originals. Some people also used to obtain loans using entirely fake title deeds or by using colour photocopies of the original title deed. Properties with unpaid loans were also being sold without informing the buyers of the existing liability on the property.

The decision to form  central registry of equitable mortgages was revealed in the 2011 budget speech by then Finance Minister Pranab Mukherjee. It was formed under the Chapter IV Securitisation and Reconstruction of Financial Assets and Enforcement of Security Interest Act, 2002 (SARFAESI Act). It was registered as a government-licensed company, under the Section 25 of the Companies Act, 1956. CERSAI become operational on 31 March 2011. 51% of the equity is owned by the government, and the rest is owned equally by National Housing Bank and 10 other public sector banks. The then Chairman of the National Housing bank, R.V. Verma, served as the first acting Registrar, Managing director and CEO of CERSAI, while continuing to hold charge at the National Housing Bank.

Objectives and functions
CERSAI's initial mandate was to maintain a central registry of equitable mortgages, where it contains information on the equitable mortgage taken on a property along with details of the financial institution that has extended the loan as well as details about the borrower. CERSAI also allowed lenders to register transactions of securitisation and asset reconstruction.

The CERSAI registry platform can be accessed online by financial institutions and the general public for a fee. However, the latter can only access information related to equitable mortgages.

This allows prospective lenders to check the registry to ensure that the property against which they are extending a loan to a borrower is not encumbered by a pre-existing security interest created by another lender. Even if it is, with details of the previous loan available to them, they can examine if the value of the collateral is sufficient for them to extend another loan, given the existing liability on the property. For the general public, especially for home buyers, it enables them to check the registry's records to ensure that any property they are planning to purchase, is free of any loan/security interest created by a lender.

CERSAI's mandate was extended in 2012 to start registration of security interests created through assignment of accounts receivables or factoring, through the passage of the Factoring Act, 2012. In January 2016, the mandate was extended even further to allow the CERSAI to start registration of security interests created on movable and intangible assets such as accounts receivables, book debt, and hypothecation as well as to start registration of all other types of mortgages used in India.

According to the government's directives, financial institutions must register details of security interests created by them with CERSAI within 30 days of its creation.

See also
 CIBIL, a credit rating company in India

References

External links 
 Official site

Financial services companies of India
Finance fraud
Government-owned companies of India
Banking in India
2011 establishments in Delhi
Indian companies established in 2011
Financial services companies established in 2011